Erich Eduard Papp was an Estonian footballer who played as a midfielder and made one appearance for the Estonia national team.

Career
Papp earned his first and only cap for Estonia on 18 July 1940 in a friendly match against Latvia, which finished as a 2–1 win in Tallinn.

Career statistics

International

References

External links
 
 

Year of birth missing
Year of death missing
Estonian footballers
Estonia international footballers
Association football midfielders
Tallinna JK players